Liberty International (the new public name of the International Society for Individual Liberty, Inc. or ISIL) is a non-profit, libertarian educational and networking organization based near Austin, Texas.  It encourages activism in libertarian and individual rights areas by the 'freely chosen strategies' of its members. Its history dates back to 1969 as the Society for Individual Liberty, founded by Don Ernsberger and Dave Walter. The previous name (ISIL) was adopted in 1989 after a merger with Libertarian International was coordinated by Vincent Miller, who became president of the new organization.

Jacek Spendel serves as a current President with Jim Elwood as the current executive director. Board members include chair Mary Ruwart, Ken Schoolland, James Lark, David Walter, Per Bylund, Lobo Tiggre, and Jose Cordiero.  The organization has members in over 80 countries.

Activities
Liberty International sponsors an annual conference which attract libertarian, classical liberal, and other political speakers. Among others, these have included Nobel laureate Milton Friedman and President of Costa Rica Miguel Ángel Rodríguez. LI also sponsors student programs including Liberty Camps and Project Arizona, and book translations.

History

Society for Individual Liberty
The Society for Individual Liberty (SIL) was founded in 1969 by Don Ernsberger and Dave Walter, who became its directors, after libertarian activists were expelled or later defected from Young Americans for Freedom (YAF) during and after their 1969 convention in St. Louis, Missouri. During the August 1969 YAF convention, traditionalists (trads) and libertarians (libs or rads) fought for control of the student organization. The libertarian faction lost. During the struggle and aftermath, the Anarcho-Libertarian Alliance, YAF Libertarian Caucus and two anarchist chapters of Students for a Democratic Society (SDS) worked together, and eventually organized into a loosely knit association that became known as SIL. The factional infighting came to a climax when a libertarian YAF member held up his draft card and lit it on fire on the convention floor, causing a 30 minutes fracas of punching, shoving and hostility, which lead to membership purges of many libertarian leaders, including Karl Hess, hitting  the California delegation especially hard, which included Dana Rohrabacher, Shawn Steel, Ron Kimberling, Rod Manis, Pat Dowd, and John Schureman, while revoking the active status of twenty-six YAF chapters. Don Ernsberger resigned from YAF, promised to continue working with SDS at Penn State and established an SIL headquarters in Philadelphia. The SIL was considered officially established by October 1969 when the Libertarian Caucus of YAF merged with Jarret Wollstein's Society for Rational Individualism (SRI), which had been a Randian organization based in Maryland It was the influence of Roy A. Childs Jr. who prompted the SRI to favor “anarcho-capitalism,” which later facilitated the merge with SIL. Although SIL encompassed a diversity of minarchists and anarchist libertarians, the organization adopted a black flag within a dollar sign to become its official symbol.

The founding of SIL is considered the defining moment that witnessed the “birth of an autonomous libertarian movement.” Purged or disillusioned YAF chapters and members withdrew from YAF and joined SIL which claimed to have 3,000 members that had grown to 103 campus chapters in the United States, “two in Canada and one each in Sweden, India and Australia” by 1970.

Activities and influence of SIL
According to historian Jonathan Schoenwald  “all student libertarian groups opposed both the Vietnam War and the draft," which prominently included SIL. From the start, SIL built a campaign on campus to abolish conscription, writing in one issue paper that “it is the height of folly to maintain that a war which is maintained only through the draft, inflation, and government coercion through the tax system can in any way prove to be an example for positive antitotalitarian action.” Identifying with the merits of decentralization, SIL also developed into a clearing house for the student libertarian movement, whose leaders wanted to keep their autonomy but likewise wanted to “band together to destroy the far Left and Right as well as the state.”

In other activities, SIL embarked on a national program to “de-control America and restore our freedom”. They sponsored educational conferences, developed a large series of one-page issue papers, created a Libertarian Speakers Bureau, published a monthly newsletter Society for Individual Liberty News and a monthly magazine The Individualist, edited by Roy Childs, worked to charter campus chapters at major universities, and published books, including A Liberty Primer by W. Alan Burris in 1979. In 1971 SIL launched a three-pronged project, which included “The Draft—Keep It Dead,” “Justice in America—Crime without Victims,” and the “‘No War, No Welfare and No Damn Taxation’ Spring Offensive.”

One of the noteworthy leaders affected by SIL activities was David Nolan, the main organizer behind the founding of the Libertarian Party in the United States. Nolan was involved with SIL as a campus leader, and first revealed the current version of his Nolan Chart in an article named "Classifying and Analyzing Politico-Economic Systems" in the January 1971 issue of SIL's The Individualist. Ed Clark, the 1980 U.S. presidential candidate, became involved in the libertarian movement through his attendance at a SIL conference in New York City.

Aftermath
One of main reasons for SIL's merger into the International Society for Individual Liberty (ISIL) in 1989 was Don Ernsberger's withdrawal from SIL activities to become deputy chief of staff for Congressman Dana Rohrabacher. After his stint as a congressional staffer, he spent several years writing civil war books and nearly 40 years as a high school and college teacher. Dave Walter became involved in the Libertarian Party, climbing to the position of national chair from 1988–1991.

In 1989 SIL merged with Libertarian International under leadership of Vincent Miller, who assumed the position of president, changing the name of the organization to the International Society for Individual Liberty (ISIL) which had members in over 80 nations and hosted annual educational conferences across the globe.

ISIL Era
ISIL was organized as a non-partisan, tax-exempt outreach and educational organization, which as an umbrella organization, represented groups and individual members in some 80 nations. During the ISIL years, Jarret Wollstein wrote 38 different educational pamphlets, where it has been estimated that over 5 million copies were distributed. Many of the pamphlets have been translated into dozens of foreign languages. 

During the 1990s, ISIL held several conferences in the former Soviet bloc, and provided scholarships for students and young leaders.  Conference networking led to the formation of the Liberty English Camps, started in 1997 in Lithuania and spreading to over 30 countries. They also translated a number of books in various languages such as Ken Schoolland’s The Adventures of Jonathan Gullible: A Free Market Odyssey (57 languages as of 2022), Ayn Rand’s Anthem (including in her native Russia), Karl Hess’s Capitalism for Kids, Frances Kendall's Super Parents Super Children, and Mary Ruwart’s Healing Our World.

ISIL Statement of Principles:

The International Society for Individual Liberty is an association of individuals and organizations dedicated to building a free and peaceful world, respect for individual rights and liberties, and an open and competitive economic system based on voluntary exchange and free trade. Members and affiliated organizations pursue this goal through independent action, using their freely chosen strategies. The association exists to promote the exchange of information and ideas, to study diverse strategies and to foster fellowship.

In 2016 ISIL adopted the public name Liberty International and added international board members, including Swedish Per Bylund, in 2019 Polish Jacek Spendel as president, and in 2022 Jose Cordiero of Spain.

For more information, see https://liberty-intl.org

See also

 Outline of libertarianism

References

External links
 

Libertarian organizations based in the United States
Libertarian think tanks
Political and economic think tanks in the United States